Bai Jianjun (born January 1958) is a lieutenant general in the People's Liberation Army of China. He was a delegate to the 13th National People's Congress.

Biography
Bai was born in Xuzhou, Jiangsu, in January 1958, and graduated from the Military Academy of the General Staff of the Armed Forces of Russia. In March 2008, he succeeded Zhang Shibo as commander of the 20th Group Army, leading his troops to participate in 2008 Sichuan earthquake relief work. In July 2013, he was commissioned as chief of staff of the Beijing Military Region, a position he held until December 2014, when he was promoted to deputy commander of the military region. He was chosen as director of the Aftermath Office of the Beijing Military Region in January 2016.

He was promoted to the rank of major general (shaojiang) in 2005 and lieutenant general (zhongjiang) in July 2014.

References

1958 births
Living people
People from Xuzhou
Military Academy of the General Staff of the Armed Forces of Russia alumni
People's Liberation Army generals from Jiangsu
People's Republic of China politicians from Jiangsu
Chinese Communist Party politicians from Jiangsu
Delegates to the 13th National People's Congress